Christopher Wehan (born January 29, 1994) is an American soccer player who plays for New Mexico United in the USL Championship. He is predominantly deployed a central attacking midfielder.

Career

Amateur and college
Wehan spent five years playing college soccer at the University of New Mexico between 2012 and 2016, including a redshirt year in 2012, where in total he scored 31 goals in 80 appearances.

Wehan also appeared for USL PDL sides OC Blues Strikers and Seattle Sounders FC U-23.

Professional 
On March 8, 2017, Wehan signed with United Soccer League club Reno 1868 FC as part of their inaugural roster. He was integral to Reno's record breaking attack, notching twelve assists which tied Matthew Dallman's single season USL record. On November 21, 2017, Wehan was named the USL Rookie of the Year.

Reno's MLS affiliate San Jose Earthquakes signed Wehan on December 14, 2017, along with Reno teammates Jimmy Ockford and Luis Felipe Fernandes. He was then temporarily loaned back to Reno, playing his first game back in Reno's 3–4 loss to Swope Park Rangers on March 17, 2018, and tallying a goal.

Wehan was released by San Jose at the end of their 2018 season.

On February 14, 2019, Wehan signed with New Mexico United ahead of their inaugural season in the USL Championship.

On November 6, 2020, Wehan joined USL Championship side Orange County SC ahead of their 2021 season. 

On August 17, 2021, Wehan transferred from Orange County SC back to New Mexico United. He signed an extension that will keep him with New Mexico United through 2023. Though the fee was undisclosed, it was believed to be the largest intra-USL transfer in league history.

Career statistics

Club

Personal
Chris's brother, Charlie, is also a professional soccer player.

References

External links
 
 
 

1994 births
Living people
American soccer players
Association football midfielders
Major League Soccer players
New Mexico Lobos men's soccer players
New Mexico United players
OC Pateadores Blues players
Orange County SC players
People from Laguna Niguel, California
Reno 1868 FC players
San Jose Earthquakes players
Seattle Sounders FC U-23 players
Soccer players from California
Sportspeople from Orange County, California
USL Championship players
USL League Two players